Munzer, or Muntzer, is a surname. Notable people with the surname include:

 Friedrich Münzer (1868–1942), German classical scholar
 Thomas Müntzer or Thomas Munzer (c.1489–1525), German preacher and theologian
 Andreas Münzer (1964–1994), Austrian-born heavyweight bodybuilder